Beverly Pingerelli is an American politician and educator serving as a member of the Arizona House of Representatives from the 28th district. She previously represented the 21st district. Elected in 2020, she assumed office on January 11, 2021.

Education 
Pingerelli earned a Bachelor of Science degree in biological sciences from Wayne State University.

Career 
She works as a science program coordinator at Grand Canyon University. Pingerelli previously worked as a cytogenetic and molecular technologist. Pingerelli is also a member of the Peoria Unified School District Governing Board. Pingerelli was elected to the Arizona House of Representatives in 2020, succeeding Tony Rivero.

Personal life 
Pingerelli and her husband, Peter, have two daughters.

References 

Living people
Women state legislators in Arizona
People from Peoria, Arizona
Wayne State University alumni
Grand Canyon University people
Republican Party members of the Arizona House of Representatives
21st-century American politicians
21st-century American women politicians
Year of birth missing (living people)